Gasponia is a genus of longhorn beetles of the subfamily Lamiinae.

 Gasponia fascicularis (Fairmaire, 1887)
 Gasponia gaurani Fairmaire, 1892
 Gasponia penicillata (Gahan, 1904)

References

Crossotini